Formica yessensis is a species of ant in the genus Formica, being known from eastern Asia and Japan. This species is especially known for its large colonies, sometimes exceeding 300 million individuals. The workers are typically 8-10 mm in length.

References

External links

yessensis
Hymenoptera of Asia
Insects described in 1913